Psakhara or Kolkhida (Phsachara, Kʼolkhida) is a village at an altitude of 20 meters from sea level in the Gagra District of Abkhazia. Official status of urban-type settlement was received in 1982.

See also
 Gagra District

Notes

References

Gagra District Administration

Other

Literature 
 Georgian Soviet Encyclopedia

Populated places in Gagra District